The Civil Cross of Merit was a military and civil decoration of Austria-Hungary established 16 Februar 1850. Emperor Franz Josef awarded the cross "to reward loyal and actively proven devotion to Emperor and Fatherland, many years of acknowledged beneficial use in public service or other merits earned for the general good".

History
The establishment took place on February 16, 1850. The decoration came in four classes. During the First World War, the award was extended to include the Iron Cross of Merit with and without a crown on April 1, 1916, for the duration of the war. The latter class was intended exclusively for lower ranking soldiers. As a sign of bravery in the face of the enemy, Emperor Karl I introduced the swords to the Cross of Merit on December 13, 1916. The cross is suspended from a red trifold ribbon in peacetime and with the ribbon Medal for Bravery in wartime.

Classes
Golden Cross of Merit with the Crown
Golden Cross of Merit
Silver Cross of Merit with the Crown
Silver Cross of Merit
Iron Cross of Merit with the Crown
Iron Cross of Merit

Endnotes

Orders, decorations, and medals of Austria-Hungary
Awards established in 1850